James William Dawes (January 8, 1845October 8, 1918) was a Republican state politician. He served as the fifth governor of Nebraska from 1883 to 1887.

He was born in McConnelsville, Ohio.  He was the great-grandson of William Dawes, a first cousin of Rufus R. Dawes, and a first cousin once removed of Charles G. Dawes.

Dawes attended Western Reserve Academy in Ohio and The Milwaukee Business College.  He studied law in his cousin's law firm and was admitted to the bar in 1871.  Dawes married his cousin, Francis Anna Dawes, in 1871.  She died in 1909.

Career
After relocating to Crete, Nebraska, Dawes worked in the mercantile business and opened a law practice. He was a delegate to the State Constitutional Convention in 1875 and a member of Nebraska State Senate in 1877. Dawes was a chairman of the Republican State Central Committee from 1876 to 1882.

Dawes was elected Governor of Nebraska in 1882, and was reelected to a second term in 1884. He later served as paymaster for the United States Army, working in Cuba and the Philippines.

Dawes served on the Doane College board of trustees for thirty-seven years.

Death
Dawes died on October 8, 1918, at the age of seventy-three, in Milwaukee, Wisconsin. He is interred at Forest Home Cemetery, Milwaukee, Wisconsin.

Legacy
Dawes County, Nebraska was named in Dawes' honor.

Between 1885 and 1890, Dawes' portrait was painted in Omaha by artist Herbert A. Collins.

See also
 List of governors of Nebraska

References

External links
 
 National Governors Association

Republican Party governors of Nebraska
Republican Party Nebraska state senators
1845 births
1918 deaths
19th-century American politicians
People from McConnelsville, Ohio
People from Crete, Nebraska
Western Reserve Academy alumni